Balkaur Singh is a member of the Haryana Legislative Assembly from the Shiromani Akali Dal representing the Kalanwali Vidhan sabha Constituency in Haryana. He joined Bharatiya Janata Party just before 2019 Haryana Legislative Assembly election.

References 

People from Sirsa district
Shiromani Akali Dal politicians
Members of the Haryana Legislative Assembly
Living people
21st-century Indian politicians
Haryana politicians
Year of birth missing (living people)
Bharatiya Janata Party politicians from Haryana